Hryhoriy Khomyshyn (also Hryhorij Khomyshyn) was a Ukrainian Greek Catholic bishop and hieromartyr.

Khomyshyn was born on 25 March 1867 in the village of Hadynkivtsi, eastern Galicia, in what is now Ternopil Oblast.  He graduated from Lviv seminary and was ordained a priest on 18 November 1893. He continued to study theology at the University of Vienna from 1894 to 1899, and in 1902, Metropolitan Andrey Sheptytsky appointed Khomyshyn the rector of the Greek Catholic Theological Seminary in Lviv. In 1904, he was consecrated as the bishop for Stanyslaviv (now Ivano-Frankivsk) at St. George's Cathedral, taking the episcopal motto "Подъ твою милость" (Church Slavonic for "Beneath thy mercy"). Throughout his tenure, spanning over four decades, he was considered the second most powerful figure in the Ukrainian Greek Catholic Church.

Unlike Sheptytsky, Khomyshyn believed that the UGCC should adopt a more westward orientation, further emphasizing the Uniate Church's relationship with Rome. This meant introducing Latinized practicies such as the Gregorian calendar and a strict adherence to clerical celibacy, which were met with controversy in his eparchy.

During the 1930s, Khomyshyn was responsible for organizing the Ukrainian Catholic People's Party, which briefly held seats in the Sejm and Senate.  He is noted as being one of only a handful of members of the Catholic hierarchy in interwar Poland to publicly oppose anti-Semitism; his tolerance towards Galician Jews likely owing to his own experience as part of Poland's Ukrainian minority. As a result of his moderate approach to Ukrainian nationalism, he would be labeled a "sellout" by the OUN and was left fearing for his life.

Khomyshyn was first arrested in 1939 by the NKVD. A critic of the Soviet system, having called the occupying forces "fierce beasts animated by ... the devil," he was arrested again in April 1945, and was then deported to Kyiv. In prison, he was tortured and advised to renounce the Union of Brest, which he refused to do.

Khomyshyn died in the Lukyanivska Prison hospital in Kyiv on 17 January 1947.  He was beatified by Pope John Paul II on 27 June 2001, as one of Mykolai Charnets'kyi and the 24 companion martyrs. The sesquicentennial of his birth in 2017 was marked by celebrations in both Ukraine and Poland, along with examinations of the bishop's social impact in academic circles.

Quote 
"At the Kyiv prison, the interrogations were conducted by Interrogator Dubok. He was a horrible sadist. He investigated my case... This Dubok told me himself how he had killed the bishop: 'So you, Khomyshyn, spoke out against communism?' The bishop, as always, replied resolutely: 'I did and I will.' Did you fight against Soviet authority?' 'Yes, I did and I will!' Then Dubok became outraged and grabbed some books written by the bishop, which lay on the table in front of him, and started cruelly beating His Excellency with them, on his head and everywhere else." - From the testimony of Father Petro Heryliuk-Kupchynysky.

References

External links
 Blessed Hryhory Khomyshyn at CatholicSaints.info
 Bishop Bl. Grigorij Chomyszyn (Khomyshyn) at Catholic-Hierarchy.org
 Bl. Gregory Chomyshyn (in Polish)
 "Story of faith, of secrecy, of death -- and life", 2001 article in the Baltimore Sun

1867 births
1947 deaths
People from Husiatyn
People from the Kingdom of Galicia and Lodomeria
Ukrainian Austro-Hungarians
University of Vienna alumni
Bishops of the Ukrainian Greek Catholic Church
20th-century Eastern Catholic bishops
Members of the Diet of Galicia and Lodomeria
Ukrainian politicians before 1991
Ukrainian writers
Polish anti-fascists
Ukrainian anti-communists
Inmates of Lukyanivska Prison
Ukrainian people who died in Soviet detention
20th-century Eastern Catholic martyrs
Ukrainian beatified people
Eastern Catholic beatified people
Beatifications by Pope John Paul II
People of the Second Polish Republic